The 13th Metro Manila Film Festival was held in 1987.

Six entries participated in the 10-day festival. Olongapo, The Great American Dream was adjudged Best Picture in the 1987 Metro Manila Film Festival as well as the Best Supporting Actress for Susan Africa among others. Anthony Alonzo once again received the Best Actor Award for Anak Badjao and Melanie Marquez was awarded the Best Actress Award as well as the Best Story for The Untold Story of Melanie Marquez. Action Is Not Missing (Crack Platoon) was the highest-grossing entry in the festival.

Entries

Winners and nominees

Awards
Winners are listed first and highlighted in boldface.

Multiple awards

References

External links

Metro Manila Film Festival
MMFF
MMFF